The 1967 Women's European Volleyball Championship was the seventh edition of the event, organised by Europe's governing volleyball body, the Confédération Européenne de Volleyball. It was hosted in several cities in Turkey from 22 October to 8 November 1967, with the final round held in Izmir.

Participating teams

Format
The tournament was played in two different stages. In the first stage, the fifteen participants were divided into four groups (three groups of four teams and one group of three teams). In the second stage, two groups were formed, one containing the winners and runners-up from all first stage groups (eight teams in total) to contest the tournament title. A second group was formed by the remaining seven teams which played for position places (9th to 15th). All groups in both stages played a single round-robin format.

Pools composition

Squads

Venues

Preliminary round

Pool A
venue location: Ankara, Turkey

|}

|}

Pool B
venue location: Istanbul, Turkey

|}

|}

Pool C
venue location: Adana, Turkey

|}

|}

Pool D
venue location: İzmir, Turkey

|}

|}

Final round

9th–15th pool
venue location: Ankara, Turkey

|}

|}

Final pool
venue location: İzmir, Turkey

|}

|}

Final ranking

References
 Confédération Européenne de Volleyball (CEV)

External links
 Results at todor66.com

European Volleyball Championships
Volleyball Championship
European1967
Volleyball 1967
1967
Women's European Volleyball Championships
October 1967 sports events in Europe
November 1967 sports events in Europe
Women's volleyball in Turkey
1960s in Ankara